The 8th Annual Nickelodeon Kids' Choice Awards was held on May 20, 1995, at the Barker Hangar in Santa Monica, California. Whitney Houston was the host. Over twenty-six million kids participated in the voting.

Performers

Glamour Girls & Melodic performed during the opening of the show.

Winners and nominees
Winners are listed first, in bold. Other nominees are in alphabetical order.

Movies

Television

Music

Sports

Miscellaneous

Special Recognition

Hall of Fame
 Boyz II Men
 Janet Jackson
 Whoopi Goldberg

References

External links
 

Nickelodeon Kids' Choice Awards
Kids' Choice Awards
Kids' Choice Awards
Kids' Choice Awards
20th century in Santa Monica, California